In mathematics, a Seifert surface (named after German mathematician Herbert Seifert) is an orientable surface whose boundary is a given knot or link.

Such surfaces can be used to study the properties of the associated knot or link. For example, many knot invariants are most easily calculated using a Seifert surface. Seifert surfaces are also interesting in their own right, and the subject of considerable research.

Specifically, let L be a tame oriented knot or link in Euclidean 3-space (or in the 3-sphere). A Seifert surface is a compact, connected, oriented surface S embedded in 3-space whose boundary is L such that the orientation on L is just the induced orientation from S.

Note that any compact, connected, oriented surface with nonempty boundary in Euclidean 3-space is the Seifert surface associated to its boundary link. A single knot or link can have many different inequivalent Seifert surfaces. A Seifert surface must be oriented. It is possible to associate surfaces to knots which are not oriented nor orientable, as well.

Examples

The standard Möbius strip has the unknot for a boundary but is not a Seifert surface for the unknot because it is not orientable.

The "checkerboard" coloring of the usual minimal crossing projection of the trefoil knot gives a Mobius strip with three half twists. As with the previous example, this is not a Seifert surface as it is not orientable. Applying Seifert's algorithm to this diagram, as expected, does produce a Seifert surface; in this case, it is a punctured torus of genus g = 1, and the Seifert matrix is

Existence and Seifert matrix

It is a theorem that any link always has an associated Seifert surface. This theorem was first published by Frankl and Pontryagin in 1930. A different proof was published in 1934 by Herbert Seifert and relies on what is now called the Seifert algorithm. The algorithm produces a Seifert surface , given a projection of the knot or link in question.

Suppose that link has m components ( for a knot), the diagram has d crossing points, and resolving the crossings (preserving the orientation of the knot) yields f circles. Then the surface  is constructed from f disjoint disks by attaching d bands. The homology group  is free abelian on 2g generators, where

 equal to a direct sum of the g copies of the matrix

The 2g × 2g integer Seifert matrix

With this, we have

where V∗ = (v(j, i)) the transpose matrix. Every integer 2g × 2g matrix  with  arises as the Seifert matrix of a knot with genus g Seifert surface.

The signature of a knot is the signature of the symmetric Seifert matrix   It is again an invariant of the knot or link.

Genus of a knot

Seifert surfaces are not at all unique: a Seifert surface S of genus g and Seifert matrix V can be modified by a topological surgery, resulting in a Seifert surface S′ of genus g + 1 and Seifert matrix

The genus of a knot K is the knot invariant defined by the minimal genus g of a Seifert surface for K.

For instance:
 An unknot—which is, by definition, the boundary of a disc—has genus zero. Moreover, the unknot is the  knot with genus zero. 
 The trefoil knot has genus 1, as does the figure-eight knot.
 The genus of a (p,q)-torus knot is (p − 1)(q − 1)/2
 The degree of a knot's Alexander polynomial is a lower bound on twice its genus.

A fundamental property of the genus is that it is additive with respect to the knot sum:

In general, the genus of a knot is difficult to compute, and the Seifert algorithm usually does not produce a Seifert surface of least genus. For this reason other related invariants are sometimes useful. (The complement of a Seifert surface generated by the Seifert algorithm is always a handlebody.) For any knot the inequality  obviously holds, so in particular these invariants place upper bounds on the genus.

The knot genus is NP-complete by work of Ian Agol, Joel Hass and William Thurston.

It has been shown that there are Seifert surfaces of the same genus that do not become isotopic either topologically or smoothly in the 4-ball.

See also
Crosscap number
Arf invariant of a knot
Slice genus

References

External links
The SeifertView programme of Jack van Wijk visualizes the Seifert surfaces of knots constructed using Seifert's algorithm.

Geometric topology
Knot theory
Surfaces